General Sir John Wilson  (1780–1856) was a British Army officer who served in the Peninsular War, and was acting Governor of British Ceylon in 1831.

He entered the British Army as an ensign in the 28th Foot in 1794 and was promoted lieutenant the following year.

He fought in the Capture of St Lucia and of St Vincent in 1796. In July of that year he was captured and exchanged in Guadaloupe, but was captured again in 1797. He was however able to rejoin his regiment in Gibraltar and take part in the Capture of Minorca in 1798. In 1799 he was given the command of a company in the newly formed Minorca Regiment which was posted to Egypt in 1801, where Wilson took part in the Battle of Alexandria. He was promoted Major in 1802.

In 1808 the Minorca Regiment, now renamed The Queen's Own German Regiment, was sent to Portugal, where Wilson was severely wounded at the Battle of Vimiero. In 1809 he was back on the Peninsular as part of the Loyal Lusitanian Legion under Sir Robert Wilson, harassing the French in the vicinity of Ciudad Rodrigo. In 1810 he was made Chief of Staff under Silveira, a Commander of the Portuguese troops. In 1911 he was made Governor of the province of Minho.

In 1813 he rejoined Wellington's army, commanding a Portuguese brigade at the Siege of San Sebastian, the Passage of the Bidassoa and the Battle of Nivelle. He was again severely wounded near Bayonne. He was made brevet colonel and knighted in 1814, and made a CB the following year.

Promoted Major-general in 1825, Wilson commanded the British troops in Ceylon from 1831 to 1839, acting as governor for a short period. He was made KCB in 1837 and  promoted Lieutenant-general in 1838.

In 1835 he fought a duel with Charles Marshall, the Chief Justice, which took place in the Cinnamon Gardens, Colombo, once a plantation.

In 1836 he was given the colonelcy of the 82nd Foot, transferring to the 11th Foot in 1841, a position he held until his death. He was promoted full general on 20 June 1854.

He died in his London home in 1856.

References

|-

|-

1780 births
1856 deaths
Devonshire Regiment officers
Governors of British Ceylon
General Officers Commanding, Ceylon
British Army generals
English duellists
28th Regiment of Foot officers
96th Regiment of Foot officers
British Army personnel of the French Revolutionary Wars
British Army personnel of the Peninsular War
Knights Commander of the Order of the Bath